St Michael's Church in St Michael's Road, Handsworth, Birmingham, England, is a Grade II listed, Church of England church, in the Diocese of Birmingham, built in 1851–1855 (and then in Staffordshire), and described as "a major local landmark".

In 1907 part of the parish was taken to form a new parish for St Peter's Church, Handsworth.

It can seat one thousand people, and was built mainly to accommodate workers from local industry.

The foundation stone was laid by William Legge, 4th Earl of Dartmouth, of Sandwell Hall, in 1852. The church was consecrated by John Lonsdale, the Bishop of Lichfield.

References

External links 
 
 1901 postcard showing interior

Handsworth
Grade II listed churches in the West Midlands (county)
Churches completed in 1855
19th-century Church of England church buildings
Grade II listed buildings in Birmingham
Handsworth
Handsworth, West Midlands